Austin Powers: Oh, Behave! is an action video game developed by Tarantula Studios and published by Rockstar Games. It was released exclusively for Game Boy Color in North America on 18 September 2000 and in Europe on 3 November 2000. It features compatibility with Rockstar's Austin Powers: Welcome to My Underground Lair!, which released simultaneously with Oh, Behave! and prominently features series antagonist Dr. Evil.

The game is a collection of mini-games and features based on the Austin Powers film series. The game also included Austin Powers-themed remakes of Pac-Man, rock paper scissors, and the board game Othello.

Gameplay

Austin Powers: Oh, Behave! is an action game designed for single-player (with some multiplayer functionality) where players can enjoy a series of Austin Powers-themed mini-games. International Man in a Platform Game is the largest of the mini-games included within Austin Powers: Oh, Behave!. Within this mini-game, the player plays as Austin Powers in a side-scrolling adventure game inspired by the movie series. The mini-game involves the player climbing obstacles and dispatching foes in an effort to find their way to the end of each level.

Mojo Maze is an Austin Powers-themed Pac-Man mini-game included within Austin Powers: Oh, Behave!. Domination is a board game similar to Othello in which the player flips chips over their opponent's to change the color of the chips. Whoever has the most chips of their color on the board by the end of the game wins. The mini-game Rock, Paper, Scissors included within Austin Powers: Oh, Behave! matches the player against a villain from the Austin Powers film series. The player is able to pick the villain that they face as well as the difficulty setting of the game. As described from Giant Bomb, "A stoplight appears and you must cycle between rock, paper, or scissors and "throw" your choice when the light turns green. If you enter your choice too soon or too late you automatically lose, the window of time depends on the difficulty you have selected. The game keeps track of your wins and losses over time."

Reception

Upon release Austin Powers: Oh, Behave! was met with mixed reviews by critics, with Chris Carle of IGN stating "Bad teeth, bad accent...bad Game Boy Color game." Robb Guido from Tampa Bay Times gave the game an F stating, "I love Austin Powers as much as anybody, but that's not enough to make me like this non-game. There are a few activities and some funny sound bites, but it takes more than that to be groovy."

Total Game Boy gave the game a 97% positive review, even featuring the game on the cover of its October 2000 issue, calling it "the most smashing idea since bread was put into a slicer and sold."

References

External links
 

2000 video games
Action video games
Game Boy Color games
Game Boy Color-only games
Rockstar Games games
Take-Two Interactive games
Video games developed in the United Kingdom